Łukasz Kacprzycki (born 29 April 1994) is a Polish professional footballer who plays as a midfielder for Norwegian club Vard Haugesund.

References 

1994 births
Living people
People from Kołobrzeg
Polish footballers
Poland youth international footballers
Association football midfielders
Ekstraklasa players
Lechia Gdańsk players
Lechia Gdańsk II players
Wisła Płock players
Kotwica Kołobrzeg footballers
Wisła Puławy players
Stal Stalowa Wola players
SK Vard Haugesund players
I liga players
II liga players
III liga players
Polish expatriate footballers
Expatriate footballers in Norway
Polish expatriate sportspeople in Norway